The European 1-Wall Tour, also known as the European Wallball Tour or the 'Euro 1 Wall' Tour is a One-Wall handball/Wallball tour that takes place at various stops across Europe including the Netherlands, Belgium, the United Kingdom, Spain and Italy.

Seasons

2020-21
Due to the COVID-19 coronavirus pandemic, the 2020-21 season was cancelled.

2021-22
Following the cancellation of the 2020-21 season due to the COVID-19 coronavirus pandemic, the 2021-22 Season was proposed to commence in October 2021 with the Belgium Open, taking place on 30 & 31 October 2021 in La Marcotte/'KillShot Club', Huissignies, Belgium. The grades offered include A, B, C & +40.

The 2022 UK Open took place on 14-15 May 2022. According to the official European 1-Wall Tour website, the 2022 Spanish Open is confirmed to be taking place on the 24-25 September 2022 and the 2022 Belgium Open is confirmed to take place on 29-30 October 2022. The 2022 French Open took place on Saturday 27 August and Sunday 28 August 2022 at the Fronton walls on the Stadium de Toulouse campus.

The 2022 Spanish Open took place on Saturday 24th and Sunday 25th September in El Pavelló Municipal de Tavernes Blanques in Valencia, Spain.

Tour stop venues
The following is a list of the venues that have been used previously for the tour.

See also
GAA Handball
International Ball game Confederation
UK Wallball
Valencian Pilota Federation

References

Handball sports
Sports leagues in Europe